The Last Warrior: A Messenger of Darkness (also known as The Last Warrior 3) is a 2021 Russian fantasy comedy film, a sequel to The Last Warrior: Root of Evil (2021) and is the third and final installment in The Last Warrior series.

The film is directed by Dmitry Dyachenko and stars Viktor Khorinyak, Mila Sivatskaya, Ekaterina Vilkova, Elena Yakovleva, Konstantin Lavronenko, Sergey Burunov and Philipp Kirkorov.

It was theatrically released in Russian by Walt Disney Studios on 23 December 2021. The film was also shown in IMAX cinemas

As of 9 January 2022 the film became the 9th highest-grossing local-language release of all time in Russia, surpassing The Last Warrior with 1.88 billion rubles ($25.5 million). In Russia, the film holds the 9th place biggest box-office audiences. This was Disney Russia's fourth and last film produced specifically for the Russian market, with the previous being The Book of Masters (2009), The Last Warrior (2017), and The Last Warrior: Root of Evil (2021). It is the most recent Disney film released in Russia, as the company paused its business there in the wake of the 2022 Russian invasion of Ukraine.

Plot 
After turning 21, Ivan intends to marry Vasilisa, but she gets kidnapped and taken to present-day Moscow, forcing Ivan and his friends to try to rescue her.

Cast 
 Viktor Khorinyak as Ivan Ilyich Muromets / Ivan Ilyich Naydenov
 Mila Sivatskaya as Vasilisa the Wise
 Elena Yakovleva as Baba Yaga
 Konstantin Lavronenko as Koschei
 Sergey Burunov as Vodyanoy, a merman
 Yelena Valyushkina as Galina, Ivan Ilyich Muromets's mother
 Garik Kharlamov as Kolobok (voice)
 Timofey Tribuntsev as the white mage Svetozar
 Philipp Kirkorov as The Firebird (in human form)
 Anna Gulyarenko as Kikimora
 Anna Yakunina as Kikimora
 Yuriy Tsurilo as Ilya Muromets, the bogatyr and Ivan Ilyich Muromets's father
 Yevgeny Dyatlov as Dobrynya Nikitich, the bogatyr
 Wolfgang Cerny as Alyosha Popovich, the bogatyr

Production

Filming 
Principal photography took place simultaneously with the filming of the previous part, entitled The Last Warrior: Root of Evil. The work was carried out in the city of Sochi, in the Republic of Karelia, and in the Perm Krai, as well as in Moscow and the Moscow Oblast, where a whole small town was rebuilt especially for filming - with a palace, trading rows and log cabins.

Reception

Box office
Having been released at the same time as the film Spider-Man: No Way Home, and A Messenger of Darkness collected 498 million rubles at the box office in eight days. By 3 January 2022 the film's box office receipts reached one billion rubles.

References

External links 
 

2021 films
2020s Russian-language films
2020s fantasy comedy films
2020s fantasy action films
2020s children's fantasy films
2020s fantasy adventure films
Russian sequel films
Walt Disney Pictures films
Films based on fairy tales
Films based on Russian folklore
Films based on Slavic mythology
Films scored by George Kallis
Russian fantasy comedy films
Russian fantasy adventure films
Russian action adventure films
Russian children's fantasy films
2020s adventure comedy films
Russian adventure comedy films
2020s fantasy thriller films
Russian fantasy thriller films
Magic realism films
Films set in forests
Science fantasy films
Films set in Moscow
Films set in Russia
Fantasy crossover films
2020s children's comedy films
2021 action adventure films
Films shot in Moscow Oblast
Films shot in the North Caucasus
Films shot in Sochi
Films shot in Russia
2021 fantasy films
2021 comedy films